Primera División de México (Mexican First Division) Apertura 2005 was the 2005 edition of the Primera Division de Mexico, crowning Mexico's fall champion in football. The season ran from August to December 2005. San Luis was promoted to the Primera División de México thus, Puebla was relegated to the Primera División A. Toluca won the championship and qualified for the CONCACAF Champions' Cup 2006.

Overview

Final standings (groups)

League table

Top goalscorers 
Players sorted first by goals scored, then by last name. Only regular season goals listed.

Source: MedioTiempo

Results

Playoffs

Bracket

Quarterfinals

Monterrey won 7–0 on aggregate.

UANL won 5–4 on aggregate.

Toluca won 1–0 on aggregate.

Pachuca won 4–0 on aggregate.

Semifinals

2–2 on aggregate. Monterrey advanced for being the higher seeded team.

Toluca won 2–1 on aggregate.

Final

Toluca won 6–3 on aggregate.

External links
 Mediotiempo.com (where information was obtained)

2005 domestic association football leagues
Apertura